The City and Guilds College Union represents students who are undertaking courses from the departments of Aeronautical, Chemical, Civil, Design, Electrical, and Mechanical Engineering, together with Bioengineering and Computing at the college. Other students within the faculty are represented by the Royal School of Mines Students' Union. These follow the names of two of the three former 'Constituent Colleges' that formed Imperial in the early 20th century. The City and Guilds Union's name derives from the original City and Guilds College from which the faculty was formed. The union hosts an annual welcome dinner, and members of the union are traditionally known as Guildsmen and Guildswomen. The students' union brings together the 8 departmental societies, and organises events throughout the year, and to welcome new students.

The Union has a traditional rivalry with the Royal College of Science Union, against which it engaged in traditional food fights, and has a chant known as the Boomalaka. Its mascots include Boanerges, nicknamed "Bo", a 1902 James & Browne which competes in the London to Brighton Veteran Car Run. The car is run by the union's Motor Club, with the car having been acquired the union for £40 in 1934. In 1955, the Guilds union president took part in the college's Commemoration Day procession. The union has in the past also organised a tricycle record attempt around the coast of Britain raising money for the RNLI, as well as raft races on the Serpentine and tugs of war in the 1960s with other constituent unions. There remain constant attempts by each union to steal the mascots of the others.

See also 
 Royal College of Science Union
 City and Guilds of London Institute

References

External links 
 Official Website

Clubs and societies of Imperial College London
Imperial College Faculty of Engineering